Lolo may be
Lolo language (Bantu)
any of several Loloish languages